Maiju Hirvonen (born 25 December 1990) is a retired Finnish footballer. Lindstrom spend most of her career at HJK. Since retiring from professional football she is the head coach of Tikkurilan Palloseura.

International career
Maiju Hirvonen was also part of the Finnish team at the 2009 European Championships. Maiju Hirvonen was a late replacement in the squad for Heini Mäkelä who injured her calf.

References

1990 births
Living people
Kansallinen Liiga players
People from Helsinki
PK-35 (women) players
Helsingin Jalkapalloklubi (women) players
Finnish women's footballers
Finland women's international footballers
Women's association football defenders